Warpath may refer to:

Great Indian Warpath, a network of trails in eastern North America used by Native Americans

Games
Warpath (video game), a 2006 FPS video game by Digital Extremes for the PC and Xbox
Warpath: Jurassic Park, a 1999 video game that accompanies the Jurassic Park movies
Warpath, a tabletop miniature game by Mantic Games
 Warpath, a 1994 space video game by Synthetic Reality for PC

Other
Warpath (comics), a mutant superhero in Marvel Comics
Warpath (film), a 1951 Cavalry Western film directed by Byron Haskin
Warpath (Boris album)
Warpath (Six Feet Under album)
Warpath, a 2006 novel by David Mack that is part of the Star Trek: Deep Space Nine relaunch series of novels
Warpath, the name of several characters in the Transformers media franchise

See also